Matthew James Ward (born 16 August 2003) is an English professional footballer who plays as a forward for  club Ipswich Town.

Career
Ward joined the Academy at Ipswich Town from Wroxham in 2020. He had scored three goals in five games for Wroxham in the Eastern Counties Football League during the abandoned 2020–21 season. In March 2021, a deal was agreed "in principle" for him to sign his first professional contract with Ipswich Town the following season. He made his first-team debut on 27 November 2022, coming on as an 82nd-minute substitute for Gassan Ahadme in a 4–0 win over Buxton in the FA Cup.

Career statistics

References

2003 births
Living people
English footballers
Association football forwards
Wroxham F.C. players
Ipswich Town F.C. players
Eastern Counties Football League players